Jonathan Rose (born July 19, 1993) is an American professional gridiron football defensive back who is currently a free agent. He most recently played for the Edmonton Elks of the Canadian Football League (CFL). He played college football at Auburn and Nebraska.

College career
Rose began his college football career at Auburn. He played for Auburn as a freshman in 2011, but was then dismissed from the team for "personal reasons" in July 2012. He signed with Nebraska in August 2012. After sitting out the 2012 season, Rose played for Nebraska from 2013 to 2015. During the 2015 season, Rose was suspended for Nebraska's game against BYU, then was suspended for games against Northwestern and Purdue due to a violation of team rules. In December 2015, Nebraska announced Rose had been dismissed from the team.

Professional career

Ottawa Redblacks
After going undrafted in the 2016 NFL Draft Rose signed with the Ottawa Redblacks in June 2016. Rose started 14 games for Ottawa in 2016 and was named a 2016 East Division All-Star. Rose helped the Redblacks win the 104th Grey Cup, recording six tackles in the win. During the 2017 season, Rose had 53 defensive tackles and two interceptions. On February 12, 2018, Rose signed a one-year contract extension with Ottawa. Rose played in 17 games in the 2018 season, and lead the league in interceptions with five (alongside four other players, including teammate Rico Murray) and also lead the league in forced fumbles with 4. Both players were named to the East Division All-Star Team by the end of the regular season. Following the season Rose and the Redblacks agreed to another one-year contract extension.

Edmonton Elks
Rose signed with the Edmonton Elks on January 4, 2021. He played in 13 games for the Elks in 2021 and was released on December 28, 2021.

References

External links
 Nebraska Cornhuskers football bio

1993 births
Living people
American players of Canadian football
American football cornerbacks
Canadian football defensive backs
Players of American football from Alabama
Auburn Tigers football players
Nebraska Cornhuskers football players
Ottawa Redblacks players
People from Leeds, Alabama
Edmonton Elks players